The Oklahoma Farm Bureau (OKFB) is a nonprofit organization dedicated to promoting, protecting, and representing the interests of farmers and ranchers in Oklahoma and is the largest farm organization in the State. OKFB is the Oklahoma level partner of the American Farm Bureau Federation (AFBF).

History
The Oklahoma Farm Bureau was originally organized in 1942 as an independent farm organization. It was chartered under the laws of the state of Oklahoma on February 3, 1942, under the State's Cooperative Marketing Association Act. OKFB affiliated with the American Farm Bureau Federation on March 1, 1942, when the first cooperative agreement was signed between the two organizations.

Overview
The Oklahoma Farm Bureau is an independent, non-governmental, non-partisan voluntary organization of farmers and ranchers who associate to promote their common interests. Each of Oklahoma's 77 counties have their own County Farm Bureau. Each County level office is individually organized and chartered under the Oklahoma non-profit laws. Each of the organized county Farm Bureaus has a Board of Directors. Bylaws governing county Farm Bureaus will vary from county to county as each is a separate entity.

Leadership
The Oklahoma Farm Bureau is governed by a ten-member Board of Directors. One Director serves from each of OKFB's nine districts, while the President serves at large.

 Rodd Moesel - President
 Gary Crawley - Vice President, District 5
 James Fuser - Secretary, District 6
 Monte Tucker - Treasurer, District 2
 Alan Jett - District 1 Director
 David VonTungeln - District 3 Director
 Jimmy Wayne Kinder - District 4 Director
 Keith KIsling - District 7 Director
 John Grundmann - District 8 Director
Jim Meek - District 9 Director

See also 
 Arkansas Farm Bureau Federation

References

External links
 Oklahoma Farm Bureau official website

Organizations established in 1942
1942 establishments in Oklahoma
American Farm Bureau Federation